Shatuo (Mandarin: 沙沱乡) is a township in Leibo County, Liangshan Yi Autonomous Prefecture, Sichuan, China. In 2010, Shatuo Township had a total population of 2,518: 1,311 males and 1,207 females: 713 aged under 14, 1,586 aged between 15 and 65 and 219 aged over 65.

References 
 

 

 
Township-level divisions of Sichuan
Leibo County